After You've Gone is a British comedy that aired on BBC One from 12 January 2007 to 21 December 2008. Starring Nicholas Lyndhurst, Celia Imrie, Dani Harmer and Ryan Sampson, After You've Gone was created by Fred Barron, who also created My Family. The writers include Barron, Ian Brown, Katie Douglas, James Hendie, Danny Robins, Andrea Solomons and Dan Tetsell. Three series and two Christmas specials aired, and work on scripts for a fourth series had already begun when the BBC withdrew the commission in November 2008 and cancelled the series.

Plot
When his former wife Ann goes to Africa to help out following a natural disaster, Jimmy Venables, a handyman, has to move back into the marital home to look after his two children, Molly and Alex. Jimmy's opinionated widowed former mother-in-law Diana Neal, a teacher, who has always disliked Jimmy, decides to help him out. Diana's husband, Patrick Neal OBE, died in 1996. Fashion-obsessed Molly is an intelligent girl who sees herself as the only adult in the family, while cheerful Alex is bright but has constantly changing ideas. Jimmy had a girlfriend, Siobhan Casey, a hairdresser, who often feels he does not pay her enough attention. Jimmy's assistant is Kev, while the landlord of his local pub, The Leek and Shepherd, is the pessimistic Bobby. In Series Two, Siobhan is the barmaid at the pub and goes back to college to study Business Studies. She appears less often in Series Three, having been partially written-out by having her split with Jimmy. The actress playing the character, Amanda Abbington, was pregnant at time of filming and so it was decided to make things easier for her by reducing her sizeable role. Bobby and Kev, meanwhile, have been developing a tendency to team up and do things which annoy Jimmy (such as kidnapping him and locking him in Kev's flat or taking legal action against him). Often compared to My Family, After You've Gone is a light comedy which pulled in good viewing figures despite often being broadcast at the same time as Coronation Street. It was often broadcast on Friday evenings on BBC One and followed by the heavier comedy of Have I Got News for You.

Characters

Cast information
Amanda Abbington (Siobhan) is seen less frequently in Series Three due to her real-life pregnancy. Nicholas Lyndhurst and Celia Imrie were already household names by the time they appeared on the programme: Lyndhurst had appeared in Only Fools and Horses, The Piglet Files and Goodnight Sweetheart while Imrie previously featured in dinnerladies and Calendar Girls. Dani Harmer and Ryan Sampson had appeared in various roles previously – the most notable being Harmer in The Story of Tracy Beaker – but have both gone on to more solid roles since. Harmer went on to star in her own programme called Dani's House (with the result that she was on BBC One for two half-hour programmes on Fridays) while Sampson had a leading role in two 2008 episodes of Doctor Who, as well as appearing in a pilot programme for BBC Three called The Things I Haven't Told You (which has not been picked up).

Episodes

Theme song
The theme song is "After You've Gone" and is performed by Jamie Cullum. The song was composed by Turner Layton with lyrics by Henry Creamer and was originally released in 1918 by Marion Harris.

Cancellation
The BBC announced in January that it had commissioned a third series with eight episodes and a Christmas special, they also announced that a fourth series had been commissioned that included ten episodes and a festive one-off for 2009. Later the BBC made a statement announcing that the third series would be the last despite writers already working on the scripts.

The cancellation cost the corporation thousands of pounds, a BBC spokesperson said "We are very proud of the programme and its achievements over the past three years but believe it has now come to a natural end."

Following the abrupt cancellation, there was a proposal to shift the series to radio, utilising the unfilmed but completed scripts for the fourth series, which the series writers behind the proposal felt could be developed on a cheap budget as no scripts required being written. However the proposal did not come to fruition.

DVD releases
All of the three series of After You've Gone have been released on DVD in the UK (Region 2). The final series was released on 18 January 2010. All 25 episodes, including the Christmas specials, have been released. The first two series of After You've Gone have also been released on DVD in Australia.

 Note: Despite being filmed in High Definition no Blu-ray release.

References

External links

2000s British sitcoms
2007 British television series debuts
2008 British television series endings
BBC television sitcoms